Georgios Manisoglou (born 18 February 2002) is a Greek professional footballer who plays as a right-back.

References

2002 births
Living people
Greek footballers
Greece youth international footballers
Super League Greece 2 players
Football League (Greece) players
Xanthi F.C. players
Association football fullbacks